Mumby Road railway station was a station on the Great Northern Railway's Mablethorpe Loop line between Willoughby, Mablethorpe and Louth. It served the village of Bilsby, and was named after the nearby village of Mumby. It opened in 1886 and closed in 1970.  The station was immortalised in 1964 in the song "Slow Train" by Flanders and Swann.

References

External links
 Disused Stations: Mumby Road

Disused railway stations in Lincolnshire
Beeching closures in England
Former Great Northern Railway stations
Railway stations in Great Britain opened in 1886
Railway stations in Great Britain closed in 1970